Greenwood High School is a comprehensive public high school established in 1915 serving the community of Greenwood, Arkansas, United States. Located in Sebastian County and within the Fort Smith metropolitan area, Greenwood High School is the sole high school managed by the Greenwood School District and serves students in grades ten through twelve.

Academics

Curriculum 
The assumed course of study at Greenwood High School is the Smart Core curriculum developed by the Arkansas Department of Education (ADE). Greenwood High School was first accredited by the North Central Association in 1977, followed by accreditation by AdvancED when the NCA unified with AdvancED starting in 2009-10.  Students engage in regular and Advanced Placement (AP) coursework and exams to obtain at least 22 units before graduation. Exceptional students have been recognized as National Merit Finalists and participated in Arkansas Governor's School.

Awards and recognition 
In 2012, Greenwood School District and its high school were recognized in the AP District of the Year Awards program in the College Board's 3rd Annual Honor Roll that consisted of 539 U.S. public school districts (6 in Arkansas) that simultaneously achieved increases in access to AP® courses for a broader number of students and improved the rate at which their AP students earned scores of 3 or higher on an AP Exam.

Extracurricular activities 
The Greenwood High School mascot is the bulldog and navy blue and white serve as the school colors.

Athletics 
For the 2012–2014 seasons, the Greenwood Bulldogs participate in the state's second largest classification (6A) within the combined 6A/7A Central Conference. Competition is primarily sanctioned by the Arkansas Activities Association with the Bulldogs competing in baseball, basketball (boys/girls), bowling, competitive cheer, cross country, dance, debate, football, golf (boys/girls), soccer (boys and girls), softball, speech, swimming (girls), tennis (boys/girls, track and field, volleyball, and wrestling.

The Bulldogs football team has made 13 appearances in the state finals, winning eight state football championships (2000, 2005, 2006, 2007, 2010, 2011, 2012, 2017, 2018, 2020) The Bulldogs finished as runners-up in 1996, 2004, 2015, and 2016. At the close of the 2012 season the football team had the third-longest win streak in state history at 38.

The girls' golf team won four state titles between 2003 and 2010. The boys' bowling team won the 2007 6A state championship, with the girls' bowling team taking the 2009 state title.

Notable alumni 
 Tyler Wilson (2008) – American football quarterback for the Arkansas Razorbacks; led Greenwood to three consecutive state football titles (2005–07)
 Drew Morgan (2013) – American football wide receiver for Arkansas Razorbacks
 Grant Morgan (2015) – American football linebacker for the Arkansas Razorbacks

References

External links 
 

 

1915 establishments in Arkansas
Educational institutions established in 1915
Public high schools in Arkansas
Schools in Sebastian County, Arkansas